Sándor Belitska (sometimes called Alexander Belitska; Ľudovítová 1 April 1872 – 7 December 1939) was a Hungarian military officer and politician, who served as Minister of Defence between 1920 and 1923. During the World War I he fought on the Eastern Front. After the war he lived as a nobleman, he was a member of the National Casino and vice-chairman of the Royal Hungarian Car Club, leader of the Dove-shooter Association and Director of the Sports Club of Margitsziget.

References
 Magyar Életrajzi Lexikon

1872 births
1939 deaths
People from Kovačica
Defence ministers of Hungary
Hungarian soldiers
Austro-Hungarian generals
Austro-Hungarian military personnel of World War I